A number of new Olympic records were set in various events at the 2008 Summer Olympics in Beijing.

Archery

Track & Field

Men's records

Women's records

Cycling

Shooting

Men's records

Women's records

 This equalled Renata Mauer's Olympic record.
 This equalled Tao Luna's Olympic record.

Swimming

Due to the use of the LZR Racer, a specialised swimming suit developed by NASA and the Australian Institute of Sport, many records were broken. New world records were set 25 times (affecting 23 distinct world records) and new Olympic records were set 65 times and one other was equalled (affecting 30 distinct Olympic records). Only Ian Thorpe's 3:40.59 in the 400 metres freestyle and Inge de Bruijn's 56.61 in the 100 metres butterfly, both set in Sydney, remained Olympic records. Michael Phelps of the United States also broke the record for the most gold medals ever won by an Olympian with a total of 14; 8 of which were won during the 2008 Summer Olympics - this was also a world record.

Men

* World record split from the 4 × 100 m freestyle relay

Note: At the 4 × 100 m freestyle relay final, anchor Jason Lezak swam the fastest 100 m split (46.06); however, this is not considered an official FINA record, as he did not swim the first leg.

Women

Weightlifting

Men's records

Women's records

References

2008 Summer Olympics
2008 Summer Olympics